is a 1984 Japanese kaiju superhero film produced by Tsuburaya Productions and directed by Kōichi Takano.

Heroes
Ultraman Zoffy
Ultraman
Ultraseven
Ultraman Jack
Ultraman Ace
Ultraman Taro
Ultraman Leo
Astra
Ultraman Joeneus
Ultra Mother
Ultra Father
Monsters

King Joe
Zambolar 
Crazygon
Gigass
Dorako
Red King
Gomora
Pagos
Peguila 
Kemur Man
Ragon 
Geronimon
Pigmon
Garamon
Kanegon 
Mongular
M1
Gyango
Zetton
Littre
Garon
Plazma
Minazma
Imitation Astra
Alien Balbalu 
Alien Pedan
Alien Guts
Black King
Alien Nackle 
Barabas
Aribunta
Giron Man
Birdon
Mururoa
Alien Temperor 
Alien Baltan

Cast
 Hikaru Urano: Zoffy
 Kenyū Horiuchi
 Shinya Ōtaki
 Masahiru Sakuramoto
 Yōko Kuri
 Sumiko Shirakawa
 Ichirō Furutachi: Announcer

Bibliography

Notes

1984 films
1980s Japanese-language films
Ultra Series films
Crossover tokusatsu films
Films scored by Shunsuke Kikuchi
1980s Japanese films